Hypericum annulatum subsp. intermedium is a subspecies of Hypericum annulatum, which is a species of the genus Hypericum. It was described by Norman Keith Bonner Robson.

Dispersion
The subspecies can be found in Northeast Tropical Africa, in Eritrea, Ethiopia, Sudan. It is also found in the Arabian Peninsula, in Saudi Arabia, Yemen, Oman, and Qatar.

References

annulatum subsp. intermedium
Plant subspecies